Luís André da Silva or simply Da Silva (born 3 March 1972) is a former Brazilian football player. He and Mario dos Santos Júnior were the first Brazilian players in the Russian Football Premier League when they joined FC Lokomotiv Nizhny Novgorod in 1995.

References

1972 births
Living people
Brazilian footballers
FC Lokomotiv Nizhny Novgorod players
Russian Premier League players
Brazilian expatriate footballers
Expatriate footballers in Russia
Association football midfielders